The East Asian–Australasian Flyway is one of the world's great flyways of migratory birds. At its northernmost it stretches eastwards from the Taimyr Peninsula in Russia to Alaska. Its southern end encompasses Australia and New Zealand.  Between these extremes the flyway covers much of eastern Asia, including China, Japan, Korea, South-East Asia and the western Pacific. The EAAF is home to over 50 million migratory water birds from over 250 different populations, including 32 globally threatened species and 19 near threatened species. It is especially important for the millions of migratory waders or shorebirds that breed in northern Asia and Alaska and spend the non-breeding season in South-East Asia and Australasia.

Flyway Site Network 
During migration, water birds rely on a system of highly productive wetlands to rest and feed, building up sufficient energy to fuel the next phase of their journey. International cooperation across their migratory range is therefore essential to conserve and protect migratory water birds and the habitats on which they depend. East Asian-Australasian Flyway Partnership (EAAFP) identified 1060 sites as internationally important for migratory birds. These sites are called the Flyway Site Network. The sites are expected to collaborate with the local community to preserve the wetland by raising awareness regarding the importance of the site, carefully documenting the number of migratory bird populations, and strictly monitoring the vegetation condition within the site. 

An important site in Alaska is the small Lake Teshekpuk, which covers just 18 percent of the National Petroleum Reserve-Alaska, but hosts more than 40 percent of all aquatic birds visiting the Alaska North Slope.

Threats

Habitat loss and degradation 
The degradation of forests in South-East Asia is prominent due to large-scale logging, which affects the habitats of many songbirds that breed in forests. Several songbirds, such as the Streaked Reed Warbler and the Black-Throated Robin, have been listed as either vulnerable or endangered. Coastal marshes, freshwater, and flooded grasslands are important food sources for songbirds like the family of Locustellidae, but many of these natural habitats are either converted to agricultural land or threatened by drainage. In response to the damage of wetlands and forests, many countries have implemented new forestry policies. An example of this is China's Natural Forest Protection Plan, which is expected to increase forest cover in eastern and southern China.

Hunting 
Another major threat is rampant hunting in South-East Asia. Reasons for hunting vary, but pet trade and hunting for food in rural areas are the most common motives. As a result of the unregulated hunting, the Yellow-breasted Bunting, whose IUCN threat status was "Least Concern" 10 years ago, has now been listed as "Vulnerable". In parts of Cambodia and Thailand, migratory songbirds including swallows and Great Reed Warblers are caught for religious "mercy releases", resulting in thousands of deaths.

Conservation Priorities 
According to a holistic review of current research, the demographics, habitat distribution, and survival rate of many endangered species remain ambiguous. Studies about these areas in the key habitats along the flyway may prove useful to conservation of migratory birds. Besides, the current Flyway Site Network mainly focuses on water birds, neglecting the protection of remained migratory birds. Scientists claim that organizations and laws focusing on protecting these birds may be needed.

Roles of Birders 
The birding community in Asia is increasing rapidly, especially in China, Thailand, Indonesia, and Philippines, due to a growing middle class. Despite language barriers, the e-bird system has successfully assisted birding communication across national boundaries, contributing to the development of EAAF. For example, the collective data from birders have contributed to many research projects, such as filling the gap of distribution of the Rufous-Headed Robin in Cambodia.

See also 
China–Australia Migratory Bird Agreement
Japan–Australia Migratory Bird Agreement
Republic of Korea–Australia Migratory Bird Agreement
Saemangeum South Korea
Saemangeum Seawall South Korea
Bonn Convention
Ramsar Convention

References

External links
 East Asia/Australasia Flyway Factsheet from BirdLife International
East Asian–Australasian Flyway Partnership
East Asian–Australasian Shorebird Site Network
Australasian Wader Studies Group
Refuelling station of East Asian Migratory Flyaway
Siberian ornithology - Australian style, 1903 Retrieved 4 January 2017.
Why North Korea is a safe haven for birds (BBC).

Bird migration flyways
.
.
.